Azam Football Club is a professional football club based in Chamazi, Temeke, Dar es Salaam, Tanzania, that competes in the Tanzanian Premier League. Nicknamed "Wana Lambalamba, Chamazi Millionaires or the Bakers", the club was founded as Mzizima Football Club in 2004, changed its name to Azam Sports Club in 2005, then Azam Football Club in 2006 and moved to its current stadium, Azam Complex Chamazi, in 2010.

References
 Azam FC Squad 2010/2011